Mausam  (lit: Weather) is a Pakistan television drama serial aired on Hum TV in 2014. Produced by Momina Duraid and written by Aliya Bukhari, it is based on the theme of love and jealousy. It stars Ahsan Khan, Hareem Farooq and Yumna Zaidi.

Synopsis
Drama shows the relationship between two cousins (Shazia and Saman) who belong to a middle-class family. They live in the same house and are very friendly with each other. Everything changes when they met a rich bachelor named Hashir. The ambitious Shazia starts dreaming of marrying Hashir, but he falls for the modest Saman. This leads to a series of manipulations by Shazia as she tries to win Hashir by keeping him away from Saman. Somehow, Shazia finally got Hashir down on her and able to make him out with her at her place while being already in relationship with Faisal where both are already doing all rough stuff keeping everyone in the dark.

Cast
 Ahsan Khan as Hashir
 Hareem Farooq as Saman
 Yumna Zaidi as Shazia
 Humaira Zaheer as Shazia's mother
 Annie Zaidi as Lubna
 Shazia Naz as Mehreen
 Ahsan Farooq
 Yasir Mazhar as Faisal
 Naila Jaffri as Saman's mother

Accolades

External links
 Official Website
 Official Facebook Page
 Mausam Hum TV's official YouTube
 Mausam Hum TV's official Dailymotion
 Hum TV's official Video channel

References

Pakistani television series
2014 Pakistani television series debuts
Pakistani drama television series
Urdu-language television shows